Lycoperdon umbrinum, commonly known as the umber-brown puffball, is a type of Puffball mushroom in the genus Lycoperdon. It is found in China, Europe, and North America.

Description
This species has a fruit body that is shaped like a top, with a short, partly buried stipe. The fruit body is initially pale brown then reddish to blackish brown, and the outer wall has slender, persistent spines up to 1 mm long. Spores are roughly spherical, 3.5–5.5 µm in diameter, with fine warts and a pedicel that is 0.5–15 µm long. It is uncommon and found mostly in coniferous woods on sandy soils.

The species is considered edible.

References

External links

California Fungi

Edible fungi
Fungi of Asia
Fungi of Europe
Fungi of North America
Puffballs
Fungi described in 1801
Taxa named by Christiaan Hendrik Persoon
umbrinum